Rafael Alves may refer to:

Rafael Alves (footballer, born 1985), Brazilian footballer who plays as a defender
Rafael Alves (footballer, born 1994), Portuguese footballer who plays as a goalkeeper